Abe Atkins (November 20, 1893 – October 17, 1961) was an American baseball third baseman in the Negro leagues. He played with the Toledo Tigers in 1923.

References

External links
 and Seamheads

Toledo Tigers players
1893 births
1961 deaths
Baseball players from Illinois
Baseball third basemen
20th-century African-American sportspeople